Jamie Anderson may refer to:

Jamie Anderson (golfer) (1842–1905), champion golfer
Jamie Anderson (musician) (born 1957), female vocalist
Jamie Anderson (scientist) (born 1971), Australian organizational theorist
Jamie Anderson (producer) (born 1985), British writer, director and producer
Jamie Anderson (snowboarder) (born 1990), female professional snowboarder
Jamie Anderson (cinematographer), American cinematographer
Jamie Anderson (actor) (born 1989), American actor in the 2006 film The Contract

See also
James Anderson (disambiguation)